Darren Hardy is an American author, keynote speaker, advisor, and former publisher of SUCCESS magazine. Hardy is a New York Times best-selling author, who wrote The Entrepreneur Roller Coaster, Living Your Best Year Ever and The Compound Effect.

Career
Hardy started his first business at age 18. He has been a central figure in the success media business for 25+ years. In 2007 he became publisher of SUCCESS magazine and Success Media. In December 2015, Hardy announced he was leaving SUCCESS magazine as publisher to pursue new opportunities. Prior to this position, Hardy held executive positions at two personal development-focused television networks. He was executive producer and master distributor of The People’s Network (TPN), and president of The Success Training Network (TSTN). Darren Hardy is most known for his popular book "The Compound Effect" that is still quoted by top critics as his best work to date.

Hardy has been awarded the ‘Master of Influence’ designation by the National Speakers Association (NSA) in honor of his professionalism in public speaking.

Success Magazine

Success was a business related magazine that contained business and self-improvement advice from entrepreneurs and others. Issues included CDs with motivational content from various contributors. The magazine was nationally distributed, and had a rate base of 402,883 and over 799,000 readers as of 2015. In February 2018, Success folded and laid-off 18 full-time staffers, as well as freelance writers and photographers.

Writings 
In 2010, Hardy wrote The Compound Effect, a book about the impact of everyday decisions which includes a guide to achieving goals. In 2011, he wrote Living Your Best Year Ever, which is a journal system to design and achieve goals. In 2015, he wrote The Entrepreneur Roller Coaster, which outlines the challenges of business ownership for entrepreneurs.

Bibliography
 The Compound Effect, 2010
 Living Your Best Year Ever, 2011
 The Entrepreneur Roller Coaster, 2015

References

External links

Insane Productivity Membership
Darren Daily - Free Daily Mentoring

American non-fiction writers
American newspaper publishers (people)
Living people
American motivational speakers
1971 births